Herbert Jackson may refer to:

Sir Herbert Jackson (chemist) (1863-1936), British chemist
Herbert Jackson (architect) (1909-?), born 1909, British architect and town planner
Herbert Leslie “Les” Jackson (1921-2008), English cricketer
Rev Herbert Jackson, see Gahini
Herb Jackson (born 1945), artist
Herb Jackson (baseball) (1883-1922), pitcher in Major League Baseball
Herbert William Jackson (1872-1940), officer of the British Indian Army

See also
Bert Jackson (disambiguation)